DGS  may refer to:

Medicine 
 Death-grip syndrome, a persistent erection due to lack of penile sensitivity
 DiGeorge syndrome, a syndrome caused by the deletion of a small piece of chromosome 22
 Dorian Gray syndrome, a type of mental illness

Schools
 Dartford Grammar School, Kent, England
 Derby Grammar School, Derby, England
 Diocesan Girls' School, Hong Kong
 Downers Grove South, an American high school

Businesses and organizations 
 DAL Global Services, a Delta Air Lines subsidiary
 Davis Graham & Stubbs, an American law firm
 Deutscher Gehörlosen-Sportverband, German Deaf Sports Association
 Direcção Geral de Segurança, the pre-1974 Portuguese Secret Police, known prior to 1969 as the PIDE
 Direction générale de la Santé, a Directorate-General of the French Ministry of Health
 Directorate-General of Health, commonly known as Direção-Geral da Saúde (DGS)
 District Grocery Stores, a grocery store cooperative in the Washington, D.C., area
 German Society for Sociology (German: Deutsche Gesellschaft für Soziologie)

Other uses 
 Dai Gyakuten Saiban, the Japanese name of the 2015 game The Great Ace Attorney: Adventures
 Deposit-guarantee scheme, a scheme for deposit insurance
 Dragon Go server, an internet server for the board game Go
 German Sign Language (German: Deutsche Gebärdensprache)

People with the surname 
 D. G. S. Dhinakaran (1935–2008), Indian Christian evangelist

See also
 Department of General Services (disambiguation), various American local agencies